The National Assembly was the legislative branch of the Beiyang government during the Republican era of Chinese history. The National Assembly was first founded in 1913, following the overthrow of the previous Qing dynasty, as the first free democratic legislature in Chinese history. It was disbanded less than a year later as President Yuan Shikai assumed dictatorial power and declared himself the Emperor of China. During the Warlord Era, the National Assembly was resurrected and disbanded more than once as different warlords vied for power and legitimacy.

In 1925, the National Revolutionary Army led by Kuomintang entered Beijing (Peking) and completed the Northern Expedition. The National Assembly, along with the Beiyang government, was dissolved and replaced by the Nationalist government led by Kuomintang. The KMT established a new appointed parliament call the Legislative Yuan.

History

Early Chinese parliament

Calls for a National Assembly were part of the platform of the revolutionaries who ultimately overthrew the Qing dynasty. In response, the Qing dynasty formed the first assembly in 1910, but it was virtually powerless and intended only as an advisory body.

Founding of the Chinese Republic

After the Xinhai Revolution, national elections yielded the bicameral 1913 National Assembly, but significantly less than one percent voted due to gender, property, tax, residential, and literacy requirements. It was not a single nationwide election but a series of local elections that began in December 1912 with most concluding in January 1913. The poll was indirect, as voters chose electors who picked the delegates, in some cases leading to instances of bribery. The Senate was elected by the provincial assemblies. The president had to pick the 64 members representing Tibet, Outer Mongolia, and Overseas Chinese for practical reasons. However, these elections had the participation of over 300 civic groups and were the most competitive nationwide elections in Chinese history.

The election results gave a clear plurality for the Kuomintang, which won 392 of the 870 seats, but there was confusion as many candidates were members in several parties concurrently. Several switched parties after the election, giving the Kuomintang 438 seats. By order of seats, the Republican, Unity, and Democratic (formerly Constitutionalist) parties later merged into the Progressive Party under Liang Qichao.

Kuomintang leader Song Jiaoren was expected to become premier, but he was assassinated on March 20. An investigation linked the crime to Premier Zhao Bingjun and possibly the provisional president, Yuan Shikai. The assembly convened for the first time on April 8 amid heated debate over the assassination. The Kuomintang was divided over solutions on how to deal with Yuan. Sun Yat-sen led a faction to rebel against Yuan on July 12 but was completely defeated within two months. The National Assembly members were compromised by threats and bribes from Yuan. He confined them and forced them to elect him formal president. Next, he outlawed the Kuomintang and expelled them from the assembly. Without a quorum, it could not convene, so Yuan disbanded it on 10 January 1914.

Warlord Era

After Yuan died, the National Assembly reconvened on 1 August 1916 under the pretext that its three-year term had been suspended and had not expired, but President Li Yuanhong was forced to disband it due to the Manchu Restoration on 1 June 1917. 130 members (mostly Kuomintang) moved to Guangzhou where they held an "extraordinary session" on 25 August under a rival government led by Sun Yat-sen, and another 120 quickly followed. After the Old Guangxi clique became disruptive, the assembly temporarily moved to Kunming and later Chongqing under Tang Jiyao's protection until Guangzhou was liberated. Lacking a quorum, they selected new members in 1919.

In the Beiyang government, Premier Duan Qirui initiated elections for a new assembly. Seventeen provinces responded, five southern provinces boycotted, and the delegates for Tibet, Xinjiang, and Qinghai were chosen by Beijing. Votes were bought and sold in an open market with prices fluctuating constantly, and fraud and abuse was widespread. Duan dominated this assembly with his Anhui clique's political wing, the Anfu Club, which won 342 of the 470 seats, with the rest going to Liang Shiyi's Communications Clique, Liang Qichao's Research Clique or to independents. It met on 12 August 1918 to elect Xu Shichang to the presidency. This assembly met until 30 August 1920 when the Anhui clique was defeated by the Zhili clique in the Zhili–Anhui War. Xu held national elections in 1921 but only eleven provinces responded so that assembly never convened.

In 1922, Li Yuanhong was brought back to the Beijing presidency, and he recalled the 1913 assembly without the 1919 "extraordinary" additions, under the same pretext that its three years are not finished. Because Sun's Guangzhou regime was in disarray due to Chen Jiongming's rebellion, most members returned to Beijing for its August 1 session. The assembly was thoroughly discredited when it elected Cao Kun president after being bribed in 1923. To cover its shame, the assembly hastily finished the constitution it was working on for a decade. It was finally dissolved after Feng Yuxiang's coup on 24 November 1924. This assembly's three-year term was spread out over eleven years and was marked by corruption, factionalism, absences, and endless debate.

Elections and terms

Timeline of National Assembly terms

Sessions

Historical Site

The meeting place of the House of Representative is located in today's Xicheng District of Beijing. The building is protected by the People's Government of Beijing Municipality as a historical site.

See also

 National Assembly Building (Beijing)
 United States Congress
 United States Electoral College
 National Assembly (Republic of China)
 National People's Congress

References

External links 
 张廷谔先生访问纪录
 宪政起步：筹备国会事务局与第一届国会选举
 论民国初期议会政治失败的原因

Government of the Republic of China
Historical legislatures in China
1913 establishments in China
1925 disestablishments in China